John Falkner  may refer to:

John Meade Falkner, English novelist and poet
John Falconer (Jesuit), also spelled John Falkner

See also
John Falconer (disambiguation)